The 2012 Panam GP Series season is the revival of Panam GP Series. This series takes their format of the defunct A1 Grand Prix with Latin American national teams. Panam GP Series has the approval of FIA and Ferrari Driver Academy. The car will be the same used in the Formula Abarth.

Cars 

The car is a Tatuus with a 1.4 L Turbo FIAT engine.

Teams 

Latin American teams have been invited to participate. Mexico, Venezuela, Chile have confirmed theirs participation.

Race calendar and results 

The schedule consists of seven races in North, Central and South America.

Report 

Previous to first race, a test was conducted in the Autódromo Hermanos Rodríguez. Gerado Nieto was the fastest driver clocked 1:19.145 in the 4 km course (181.94 km/h). Rodolfo Camarillo had the second fastest time in 1:19.183, and the NASCAR driver, Hugo Oliveras, clocked 1:19.341.

Round 1: Mexico 

The season began in Mexico. Hugo Oliveras set the fastest time in the qualifying session. The Ecuadorian driver, Sebastián Merchán, was the second fastest. In the first race Merchán took the lead in the first lap, but Oliveras recovered the first place in the second lap for win the race (27:42.000, 173.8 km/h). Merchán came in second place. Homero Richards and Francisco Cerullo fight for the third place, being the winner Richards. The second race was started with reverse grid, Luis Carlos Martínez in the pole, but Gerardo Nieto became the leader in the first lap to win the race (26:24.751, 181.73 km/h). Francisco Cerullo never can reach to Nieto, and finished in second place. Javier Amado, Homero Richards and Hugo Oliveras fought for the third place, finally Oliveras won the position.

Round 2: Guatemala 

The second round was carried out in Guatemala. The first race was won by the local driver Andrés Saravia. Saravia had taken the pole in the qualification, and dominated all of the race. The second race was won by Gerardo Nieto, who took his second victory, and the lead of the championship.

Standings

Drivers'

Nations' Cup

References

External links 
 Official Panam GP Series website

Panam GP